Robert Brandford was a police officer in the Metropolitan Police in the 1800s. He is reputed to be the first black police officer in London.

Little is known about Brandford, and no photographs of him exist. He joined the Metropolitan Police on 24 September 1838, and was posted to Stone's End Police Station, near Borough High Street. He was promoted to Sergeant in 1846, and then inspector in 1851. By 1856 he was recorded as Superintendent of M Division, covering what is now Southwark. Branford was also commended for his performance by a magistrate at Southwark Court.

He was described, in the 1893 book "Scotland Yard, Past and Present", as “Not an educated man: but what to my idea was of much greater importance, he possessed a thorough knowledge of police matters in general. I should say he was about the only half-caste superintendent officer the Met ever had.”

References 

Metropolitan Police officers
1817 births
1869 deaths